Hymenoxys ambigens is a species of flowering plant in the daisy family known by the common name Pinaleño Mountains rubberweed. It is native to the states of Arizona and New Mexico in the southwestern United States.

Hymenoxys ambigens is a perennial herb up to 150 cm (5 feet) tall. Leaves have very narrow lobes resembling branching threads. One plant can produce an array of 25–400 small yellow flower heads, each head with 3-5 ray flowers and 6–15 disc flowers.

Varieties
Hymenoxys ambigens var. ambigens - Mescal, Pinaleño, and Santa Teresa Mountains in Arizona
Hymenoxys ambigens var. floribunda (A.Gray) W.L.Wagner - Chiricahua, Dos Cabezas, Dragoon, Little Dragoon, and Mule Mountains in Arizona
Hymenoxys ambigens var.  neomexicana W. L. Wagner - Animas + Peloncillo Mountains in New Mexico

History 
In 1882, Sarah Plummer Lemmon discovered the species. Harvard University botanist, Asa Gray, first described the species, naming it Plummera floribunda in her honor. Plummera was redefined as a subgenus of Hymenoxys in 1994.

References

External links

ambigens
Flora of Arizona
Flora of New Mexico
~
Plants described in 1929